Local elections were held on 14 March 2021 in Nikšić Municipality, on 9 May 2021 in Herceg Novi Municipality, while the elections in the municipalities of Cetinje, Mojkovac and Petnjica were held on 5 December 2021.

Elections resulted in won for local-level opposition parties in 3 out of 5 municipalities. Large coalition consisting of the former ZBCG (led by DF), MNN (led by DCG) and CnB (led by URA) formed local government in Nikšić and Mojkovac municipalities, while SDP and the independent list "Old Guard of the LSCG" rise in Cetinje Old Royal Capital. The DPS keep governing in Petnjica, in coalition with SD and BS, while the DCG keep its mayoral post in Herceg Novi, in coalition with the local DF and URA.
Novska Lista is a local pro-Serb Herceg Novi based political party that started from few former NSD and SNP members who left in 2012, few months after creation of DF.

Results

March elections

Nikšić

May elections

Herceg Novi

December elections

Cetinje

Mojkovac

Petnjica

List of mayors and local governments

Notes

References

2021 in Montenegro
Montenegro
Local elections in Montenegro